Brunoy is a commune in the southeastern suburbs of Paris, Île-de-France, France. The tenor Louis Nourrit (1780–1831) died in Brunoy.

The city has a church Saint-Medard, richly decorated in the Louis XVI style. Organ Festival takes place each year in November.

Brunoy is home to a branch of Yeshivas Tomchei Tmimim Lubavitch, which attracts hundreds of students from around the world, most notably from the United States of America and Israel.

Population

Inhabitants of Brunoy are known as Brunoyens in French.

Transportation
Brunoy is served by Brunoy station on Paris RER line D.

Twin towns
The town is twinned with the borough of Reigate and Banstead.

References

External links
Official website 

Mayors of Essonne Association 

Communes of Essonne